HNLMS Van Amstel (F831) is a ship of the  of multi-purpose frigates (also known as "M-fregat" class) of the Royal Netherlands Navy. Built by the shipyard Koninklijke Schelde Groep in Vlissingen. The ship is named after the Dutch Captain Jan van Amstel.

History

1990s
In 1995 the ship assisted in the response after Hurricane Luis at the island of Sint Maarten in the Netherlands Antilles.

2000s
The ship was deployed in a multinational force in the Oman Sea in 2001/2002 in Operation Enduring Freedom.

In September 2005 the ship assisted in the Dutch response to Hurricane Katrina by sending its sailors ashore to southern Mississippi to distribute aid supplies to hurricane victims in conjunction with Mexican marines, U.S. Navy sailors, and U.S. Marines.

2010s
When the ship's boarding team approached the dhow, the team found 11 suspected pirates of Somali origin and a total of 17 hostages on board. After taking the suspected pirates to the Van Amstel, the boarding team found significant evidence that linked the 11 men to an armed attack on the motor tanker Super Lady a few days prior. The 17 hostages were freed. They were Iranian fishermen.

In 2016, Van Amstel joined Standing NATO Maritime Group 2 (SNMG2).

The busts happened in waters between Curaçao and Colombia.

From 26 June to 6 July 2018, Van Amstel participated in Exercise Dynamic Mongoose 2018 along with units from other nations.

2020s
In May 2022, Van Amstel participated in the  Mjølner exercise off Andøy Island, Norway.

On 9 October 2022, Van Amstel along with  deployed to conduct drills with the aircraft carrier .

References

External links
 Homepage of Hr. Ms. Van Amstel (in Dutch)
 

Karel Doorman-class frigates
1990 ships
Frigates of the Netherlands